Mayank Anand is an Indian actor.

Career
Mayank's most popular role to date was Dr. Rahul Garewal in Dill Mill Gayye on STAR One opposite Drashti Dhami.

Personal life

He married Shraddha Nigam in December 2012. They have since launched a fashion label together at the Lakme Fashion Week.

Television shows
 Dill Mill Gayye - Dr. Rahul Garewal
 Hotel Kingston - Niklesh Mehra aka Nik
 Naaginn as Vikram
 Bombay Talking on Zee Café
 Saarrthi on STAR Plus
 Hello Dollie as Nikshay Rana on STAR Plus
 Na Na Karte on Star One
 Ssshhhh...Phir Koi Hai - Bhediya as Madhukar (Episode 14)
 Ssshhhh...Phir Koi Hai - Honeymoon as Vineet (Episode 22)
 Ssshhhh...Phir Koi Hai - Bhai as Anil (Episode 30)

References

External links

Official website
 

Living people
Indian male television actors
1979 births
Punjabi people
Punjabi Hindus
Male actors from Mumbai